Framinghamia is a monotypic moth genus of the family Crambidae described by Embrik Strand in 1920. Its only species, Framinghamia helvalis, was described by Francis Walker in 1859. It is found in North America, where it has been recorded from Alberta to New Brunswick, south to Utah, Texas and Florida. The type locality is Framingham, Massachusetts.

References

Spilomelinae
Crambidae genera
Monotypic moth genera
Taxa named by Embrik Strand